Dendroctonus frontalis, the Southern Pine Beetle (also known as SPB), is a species of bark beetle native to the forests of southern United States, Mexico and Central America. It is short-legged, the front of the males head is notched, the female possesses a wide elevated transverse ridge, and the hind abdomen of both is round.

Tree infestations
Dendroctonus frontalis inhabits several Pinus species. Host trees in the United States include primarily P. taeda (loblolly pine), P. echinata (shortleaf pine), P. elliottii (slash pine), P. virginiana (Virginia pine, scrub pine, Jersey pine, Possum pine), P. rigida ( pitch pine), P. palustris (longleaf pine ), P. serotina (pond pine, marsh pine or pocosin pine), P. pungens (table mountain pine, hickory pine, prickly pine, or mountain pine) and P. strobus (eastern white pine, northern white pine, white pine, Weymouth pine (British), and soft pine), P. ponderosa (ponderosa pine, bull pine, blackjack pine, western yellow-pine, or filipinus pine), P. engelmannii (Apache pine) and P. leiophylla (Chihuahua pine, smooth-leaf pine, yellow pine, and in Mexico, tlacocote and ocote chino). Host trees in Central America include P. caribaea (caribbean pine), P. engelmannii (see above), P. leiophylla (see above), P. maximinoi (thinleaf pine), and P. oocarpa (ocote, ocote chino, pino amarillo, pino avellano, mexican yellow pine, egg-cone pine, and hazelnut pine). In the south-eastern United States it is considered one of the most important causes of economic loss in forestry. About $900 million worth of damage was caused by this species from 1960 to 1990 in the southern United States.

Southern Pine Bark Beetle (SPB), Chemical Behavior 
The chemical behavior of the Southern Pine Beetle, looking at how a chemical presented by the female, when applied to trees such as Conifers as loblolly pines (Pinus taeda), longleaf (Pinus palustris), shortleaf (Pinus echinata), slash (Pinus elliottii), Virginia (Pinus virginiana), is a communicator, attracting both male and female SPBs to that tree. This attraction is known as an aggregation pheromone which presents a sensor behavior for communities of SPBs to the area, causing an infestation of Pine trees in the Southeastern U.S.

Selection of host trees, damaged, attractions, and attacks 
When a tree or area of trees are selected for attack, a host tree is generally selected by the female SPB. She colonizes the selects the host the tree  The host is usually a pine tree that is or has been stressed or damaged from natural disasters such as tornados and heavy winds, and areas where there may be a lack or thinning of pine trees causing a dense forest of pines. But, once SPBs are summoned to an area by the pheromone issued the female SPB, pines, stressed or damaged, and in a dense area of trees in good health, the stressed, or damaged are attacked and continuously destroyed. Southern Pine Beetles (SPB) are one of the most destructive insects to forests within the southeastern parts of us and the eradication process is costly.

The female Southern Pine Beetle (SPB) has been known to select host pine trees as the initial attack. The selected pine tree becomes a host site for the female SPBs to lay their eggs. A combination of the female SPB pheromone (fontalin which increases with the effectiveness of trans-verbenol also produced by the female SPB) and the resin from the pine tree of selection, initiate infestations and send chemical signals for all other SPBs to join.  When the female SPB drills within the bark of these pine trees, she creates pitch tubes. These pitch tubes cause the resin from the pine tree to begin to release as a thick sticky white color that consists of odor and has the appearance of popcorn on the outer back. By drilling through the inner bark, the natural food supply of these pine trees is cut off by the female SPB creating niches within the phloem of the tree to deposit her eggs. The drilling of these pitch holes interrupts the water supply, limiting the trees' life functioning cycle such as photosynthesis and needed foods for the tree to live.   The food supply that the phloem provides, releases an aggregation pheromone known frontalin.  The host trees selected by the female SPB in the Southeastern part of the US are preferably loblolly pine tree stands or conifer trees. The female deposits her eggs after the release of her chemical pheromone within the bark of the tree. Once this chemical aggregate is detected, other male and female SPBs are signaled. Once other beetles arrive, individual trees are selected for continuous pheromones and host chemical orders are initiators in the selection of other nearby trees as hosts using an infestation to colonize.

Frontalin, Trans-verbenol, Endo-brevicomin 
Frontalin IUPAC:(1S,5R)-1,5-dimethyl-6,8-dioxabicyclo[3.2.1]octane) and Trans-verbenol are a phenome of the female Southern Pine Beetle (SPB). While endo-brevicomin is a phenome of the male SPB. These pheromones are used as signals in general attacks by SPB of many forest in the U.S. and other countries.

References

External links

 Texas A&M Agrilife: Southern Pine Bark Beetle
Featured Creatures: Dendroctonus frontalis, Southern pine beetle, UF / IFAS
Southern Pine Beetle on the Forest Encyclopedia Network

Woodboring beetles
Scolytinae
Beetles of North America
Insect pests of tropical forests
Beetles described in 1868